Jason Smalley (born March 26, 1981) is an American politician who served as a member the Oklahoma Senate for the 28th district between 2014-2020 and as a member of the Oklahoma House of Representatives from the 32nd district between 2012-2014.

Smalley resigned to accept a private sector position on January 31, 2020.

References

1981 births
Living people
Republican Party members of the Oklahoma House of Representatives
Republican Party Oklahoma state senators
21st-century American politicians